Walter Erbì (born 8 January 1968) is an Italian prelate of the Catholic Church who works in the diplomatic service of the Holy See.

Biography
Walter Erbì was born on 8 January 1968 in Turin, Italy. He was ordained a priest for the Diocese of Iglesias on 10 May 1992.
To prepare for a diplomatic career he joined the Pontifical Ecclesiastical Academy in 1999. He entered the diplomatic service of the Holy See on 1 July 2001 and has served in the apostolic nunciature in the Philippines, in the General Affairs Section of the Secretariat of State and in the Pontifical Representations in Italy, the United States of America and Turkey.  He graduated in canon law.

He speaks Italian, Spanish, English and French. 

On 16 July 2022, Pope Francis appointed him Titular Archbishop of Nepi and Apostolic Nuncio to Liberia.

On 20 July 2022, Pope Francis also added the post of nuncio to Sierra Leone. He was consecrated as an archbishop on 3 September 2022.

On 30 November 2022, Pope Francis also appointed him as nuncio to Gambia.

See also
 List of heads of the diplomatic missions of the Holy See

References

1968 births
20th-century Italian Roman Catholic priests
21st-century Italian Roman Catholic priests
Apostolic Nuncios to Liberia
Apostolic Nuncios to Sierra Leone
Diplomats of the Holy See
Clergy from Turin
Living people
Pontifical Ecclesiastical Academy alumni